Rastislav Václavik (born 28 February 1997) is a Slovak footballer who plays for MFK Tatran Liptovský Mikuláš as a midfielder.

Club career

MFK Tatran Liptovský Mikuláš
Václavik made his professional debut for MFK Tatran Liptovský Mikuláš against FK Pohronie on 18 September 2021, coming as substitute in the 88th minute of the match and he netted 5th goal in the 90th minute from the penalty.

References

External links
 MFK Tatran Liptovský Mikuláš official club profile 
 
 
 Futbalnet profile 

1997 births
Living people
Slovak footballers
Association football midfielders
MŠK Žilina players
MŠK Rimavská Sobota players
MFK Tatran Liptovský Mikuláš players
2. Liga (Slovakia) players